The Helms Dynasty was a villainous professional wrestling tag team in Total Nonstop Action Wrestling (TNA), which consisted of Andrew Everett and Trevor Lee, and manager Gregory Shane Helms. The general background of the team was that Helms helped train both Everett and Lee and in OMEGA Wrestling, and then brought them with him to TNA to be the top entity of the X Division.

History
On the February 2, 2016, episode of Impact Wrestling, Trevor Lee defeated Tigre Uno to win the TNA X Division Championship with the help from his new manager Gregory Shane Helms. During his reigns, he successfully retain his title against Tigre Uno, Eddie Edwards and DJZ. On the April 19 episode of Impact Wrestling, Andrew Everett interrupt a match between Lee, Eddie Edwards and DJZ, helping Lee, forming The Helms Dynasty. On the May 17 episode of Impact Wrestling, The Helms Dynasty faced the team of Edwards and DJZ in a losing effort. On June 12 at Slammiversary, Lee lost the X Division Championship to Edwards, ending his reign at 155 days.

On the October 6 episode of Impact Wrestling, The Helms Dynasty would team with Marshe Rockett in the first Team X Gold match losing against DJZ, Mandrews and Braxton Sutter. On the November 24 episode of Impact Wrestling, The Helms Dynasty and Rockett would team up once more in a losing effort in a Team X Gold triple threat elimination match, going up against Team Go for Broke (DJZ, Mandrews and Braxton Sutter) and Decay and Rockstar Spud, where the winning team would receive #1 contendership for the X Division Championship. During a TNA taping Lee defeated DJZ to win the TNA X Division Championship for the second time. On February 9, 2017, Everett was attacked by Lee and Helms, ending the team.

Championships and accomplishments
 Total Nonstop Action Wrestling
 TNA X Division Championship (2 times) – Trevor Lee
 Race for the Case (2017 – Blue Case) – Trevor Lee
All American Wrestling
AAW Tag Team Championship (1 time)

References

External links
 Trevor Lee's TNA profile
 Andrew Everett's TNA profile

Independent promotions teams and stables
Impact Wrestling teams and stables